Lester Simpson is an English folk singer and radio presenter on BBC Local Radio in Derbyshire, Nottinghamshire and Leicestershire. He features in the three-piece folk group Coope, Boyes and Simpson, and on the Folkwaves radio program with Mick Peat.

The Belper Folk Club was a favourite with Lester in the early to mid 1970s.  As a "floor singer" at this venue, he learned skills which he later developed with his fellows in Coope, Boyes and Simpson.

References

BBC radio presenters
British folk singers
English melodeon players
Living people
Year of birth missing (living people)
21st-century accordionists
Blue Murder (folk group) members